Center Township is one of ten townships in Posey County, Indiana. As of the 2000 census, its population was 1,321.

History
Center Township was established in 1859. The township was so named on account of its location being near the geographical center of Posey County.

Adjacent Townships
 Posey County
 Harmony Township
 Lynn Township
 Robb Township
 Robinson Township

Unincorporated Places
Hepburn
Oliver
Wadesville

References

External links
 Indiana Township Association
 United Township Association of Indiana

Townships in Posey County, Indiana
Townships in Indiana